"All of the Dreamers" is an alternative rock song recorded by Australian alternative rock band Powderfinger. The song was written by Powderfinger and produced by Nick DiDia. It was released as the lead single from Powderfinger's seventh album, Golden Rule, in 2009.

The music video features the band setting up their instruments playing the song within the Brisbane CBD, but blown up to "King-Kong" size. They dwarf the Brisbane CBD skyline then take on other parts of the world. At the end, the band finishes the song while standing on top of Australia.

A brief part of the song was played at the ARIA Music Awards in 2009.

The Head Pictures directed music video was nominated for Best Video at the ARIA Music Awards of 2010.

Track listing

Charts

References

Powderfinger songs
2009 songs
Songs written by Jon Coghill
Songs written by John Collins (Australian musician)
Songs written by Bernard Fanning
Songs written by Ian Haug
Songs written by Darren Middleton
Universal Records singles